Château de Chennebrun is a castle in Chennebrun, Eure, France.

The current castle was built in the 17th century. It replaced an earlier castle on the site. 

The French slighted the castle in 1168. King Henry I of England retaliated in 1169, slighted the French castle at Châteauneuf.

References
Power, Daniel. The Norman Frontier in the Twelfth and Early Thirteenth Centuries. Cambridge studies in medieval life and thought. Cambridge University Press, 2004. 

Châteaux in Eure
Buildings and structures completed in the 14th century
Monuments historiques of Eure